|}

The Marygate Fillies' Stakes is a Listed flat horse race in Great Britain open to fillies aged two years only.
It is run at York over a distance of 5 furlongs (1,006 metres), and it is scheduled to take place each year in May.

The race was first run in 2005.

Winners

See also 
Horse racing in Great Britain
List of British flat horse races

References

Racing Post:

Flat races in Great Britain
York Racecourse
Flat horse races for two-year-olds
Recurring sporting events established in 2005